The Lent Bumps 2006 was a series of rowing races held at Cambridge University from Tuesday 28 February 2006 until Saturday 4 March 2006. The event was run as a bumps race and has been held annually in late-February or early March in this format since 1887. See Lent Bumps for the format of the races. This year, a total of 121 crews took part (69 men's crews and 52 women's crews), with nearly 1100 participants in total.

Head of the River crews
 Caius men gained their 5th consecutive headship and 6th since 1999. Their 19-day hold on the Lent headship is, so far, the 5th longest continuous defence in history (Lady Margaret have the longest spell of 26 consecutive days at the top between 1975 and 1981).

 Clare women bumped Downing to take their first ever Lent Headship (they started Head of the Lents, but lost it that year, in the very first women's Lent Bumps in 1976).

Highest 2nd VIIIs
 The highest men's 2nd VIII at the end of the week was Lady Margaret II, who took it from Caius II on the 2nd day.

 The highest women's 2nd VIII for the 6th consecutive year was Jesus II.

Links to races in other years

Bumps Charts
Below are the bumps charts all four men's and all three women's divisions, with the men's event on the left and women's event on the right. The bumps chart represents the progress of every crew over all four days of the racing. To follow the progress of any particular crew, simply find the crew's name on the left side of the chart and follow the line to the end-of-the-week finishing position on the right of the chart.

Note that this chart may not be displayed correctly if you are using a large font size on your browser.

The Getting-on Race
The Getting-on Race (GoR) allows a number of crews which did not already have a place from last year's races to compete for the right to race this year. Up to ten crews are removed from the bottom of last year's finishing order, who must then race alongside new entrants to decide which crews gain a place (with one bumps place per 3 crews competing, subject to the maximum of 10 available places).

The 2006 Lent Bumps Getting-on Race took place on 24 February 2006.

Successful crews
The successful crews which qualified to compete in the bumps were (displayed in their order of racing in the draw);

Women
Trinity Hall II
Clare II
1st & 3rd Trinity II
Newnham III
CCAT II
Peterhouse II
King's II
CCAT III
Fitzwilliam II
Wolfson II

Men
Pembroke III
Corpus Christi II
Christ's III
Selwyn III
Emmanuel III
CCAT II
Jesus IV
Fitzwilliam III
1st & 3rd Trinity V
St. Edmund's II

Lent Bumps results
Lent Bumps
2006 in English sport